The Long, the Short, the Cat, also known as The Tall, the Short, the Cat, is a 1967 Italian comedy film directed by Lucio Fulci and starring the comic duo Franco and Ciccio.

Plot  
Franco and Ciccio, alongside Gina, are servants to a wealthy elderly countess who believes that her pet cat Archibald is a reincarnation of her late husband. The mischievous cat frequently wanders off, and local business owners take advantage of Franco and Ciccio by charging them for damages the cat supposedly caused. After discovering Archibald 'cheating' on her with a female cat, the Countess dies from shock. Franco and Ciccio kick the cat out of the house, only to learn that they are due to inherit one million lira a month from the late countess on the condition that they care for Archibald. The two track down the cat to a dinner party hosted by a superstitious countess, who allows the two to stay despite their poor etiquette to avoid having thirteen guests at the table. As guests leave due to Ciccio's manners and new ones arrive late to the party, Ciccio is brought back and forth to the table as needed to avoid having thirteen guests, while Franco flirts with a maid.

The two wreck the dinner party after making a mess trying to catch Archibald, but before they're kicked out, the guests learn that they're due to inherit a million lira, and all quickly attempt to find the cat. The next morning, Archibald is spotted entering an embassy. In the embassy, a prime minister is meeting with officials to discuss the threat of being assassinated by The Cat, a mysterious assassin whose identity is unknown. Franco & Ciccio get caught trying to sneak in, and are interrogated by Mr. Smith, an agent from the CIA, who believes the cat they're looking for is the assassin. Using tiny microphones attached to the duo, Mr. Smith and Police Commissioner Proietti spy on them in an attempt to track down the assassin. They overhear Franco & Ciccio asking local business owners about Archibald, and each of them get arrested to be interrogated after the duo leaves. The Cat learns that Franco & Ciccio allegedly know him, and plots to kill them, while authorities plan to use them as bait to catch the assassin.

The Cat holds Franco, Ciccio, and Gina at gunpoint and ties them up, planting a time bomb with them. Archibald topples the bomb off the balcony and into The Cat's car, and it explodes just as he tries to leave. After being untied by authorities, Franco & Ciccio finally catch Archibald, and live at the late countess's villa with Gina.

Cast
 Franco Franchi as Franco
 Ciccio Ingrassia as Ciccio
 Gianni Agus as Gianni
 Ivy Holzer as Gina
 Ivano Staccioli as The Cat
 Giusi Raspani Dandolo as The Countess
 Daniele Vargas as Mr. Smith
 Tano Cimarosa as Dustman
 Enzo La Torre as Police Commissioner Proietti  
 Renato Chiantoni as Doctor
 Ugo Fangareggi as Pork Butcher
 Ignazio Leone as Manager of the pool hall
 Andrea Scotti as Ambassador's secretary

References

External links

The Long, the Short, the Cat at Variety Distribution

1967 films
1960s buddy comedy films
Films about cats
Films directed by Lucio Fulci
Italian buddy comedy films
Films about animals
1967 comedy films
1960s Italian-language films
1960s Italian films